Martin Barstow is a Professor of Astrophysics and Space Science at the Department of Physics and Astronomy at the University of Leicester and the former President of the Royal Astronomical Society.

Research

Barstow's research is on white dwarfs, the interstellar medium and UV instrumentation.

Royal Astronomical Society
Having been a Councillor and Secretary for the Royal Astronomical Society between 2005 and 2013, he was elected to be the 89th President of the Royal Astronomical Society in 2013. After a year as President Elect he assumed the position of President in May 2014.

References 

Living people
21st-century British astronomers
Academics of the University of Leicester
Presidents of the Royal Astronomical Society
Year of birth missing (living people)